Roman Ivanovich Personov (January 4, 1932 – January 17, 2002) was a Soviet and Russian scientist, professor, doctor, one of the founders of selective laser spectroscopy of complex molecules in solids (frozen solutions).

He was awarded the Humboldt Prize in 1998.

Moscow State Pedagogical University alumni
Russian physical chemists
1932 births
2002 deaths
Spectroscopists